Shepp may refer to:

Carol Shepp McCain or Carol McCain (born 1938), former model, director of the White House Visitors Office, and event planner
Archie Shepp (born 1937), American jazz saxophonist
Lawrence Shepp (1936–2013), American mathematician, specializing in statistics and computational tomography
Shepparton, A city in Victoria, Australia with a population of around 50,000 people

See also
XYZ inequality, also called the Fishburn-Shepp inequality, the inequality for the number of extensions of partial orders to linear orders
Sepp (disambiguation)
Shep (disambiguation)
Sheppard (disambiguation)
Sheppey (disambiguation)